Michael or Mike Waters may refer to:

 Michael Waters (writer) (born 1949), American writer
 Mick Waters (education) (born 1949), British educational theorist
 Mike Waters (politician) (born 1967), South African politician
 Michael R. Waters, professor of anthropology and geography
 Mike Waters, wrestler with professional wrestling tag team The UK Pitbulls
 Mikey Waters, a fictional character played by River Phoenix in Gus Van Sant's 1991 film My Own Private Idaho

See also
 Michael Walters (disambiguation)
 Mick Waters (born 1941), Irish hurler